Rodolfo Martín Arruabarrena (born 20 July 1975) is an Argentine professional football manager and former footballer, who is the current head coach of the United Arab Emirates national football team.

As a footballer, he played as a left back and spent most of his career with Boca Juniors, where he began his professional career, and Spanish club Villarreal.

Club career

Argentina
"El Vasco" Arruabarrena (The Basque) debuted professionally in 1993 with Boca Juniors, where he played until 2000, except for the Apertura 1996, when he was lent to Rosario Central for 6 months. After returning to Boca, he gained a place in the regular squad.

While with Boca, Rodolfo Arruabarrena won the Apertura in 1998 and the Clausura in 1999 Argentine first division tournaments, as well as the Copa Libertadores 2000. He played a total of 178 games for Boca in all competitions, scoring 7 goals.

Villarreal
From Boca he moved to Spanish Villarreal in mid 2000. Because of his reliability while playing as the team's left-back, he has been the team's captain in several occasions. He holds Villarreal's record of appearances in La Liga, with 178 first division matches with El Submarino Amarillo (as of 9 December 2005).

Arruabarrena's goals in the 2005–2006 Champions League helped to eliminate Scottish giants Rangers F.C. and Italians Internazionale to reach the semi-finals in the club's first ever season in the competition.

With Villarreal CF he won the UEFA Intertoto Cup in 2003 and 2004, and played 200 league and international matches for the Spanish team (as of 10 September 2006).

AEK Athens
On 3 May 2007, El Vasco signed a three-year contract with Greek Super League runners-up AEK for 800,000 euros per year for two years, extendable for a third. According to Arruabarrena, an important role for his decision to continue his career in Greece was played by Lorenzo Serra Ferrer (AEK manager) and Demis Nikolaidis (former star player and later president of his new club who played for Atlético Madrid in 2003–2004).

In Rivaldo's debut with AEK Arruabarrena set up the Brazilian legend to score on a header. Arruabarrena also set up Ismael Blanco to score against Getafe in a UEFA Cup match. Arruabarrena managed to have 25 appearances for AEK in one season but halfway through the season he suffered a serious injury.

On 29 July 2008, AEK Athens manager Giorgos Donis announced to the press that Arruabarrena was no longer in the team's plans.

International career
El Vasco played five matches with the Argentina national football team, as well as several with the youth team. Arruabarrena made his first cap against Chile in 1994. He also played some matches in 1995 and one against England on 23 February 2000. Arruabarrena was not called up again for national team duty until September 2006, when Alfio Basile called him for a friendly match against Spain, and then again in February 2007 for another friendly against France. Arruabarrena was also called up for another friendly match against Chile on 18 April 2007 but he was left on the substitutes' bench.

Career statistics

International career statistics

Managerial statistics

Honours

Player
Boca Juniors (4)
 Primera División (2): 1998 Apertura, 1999 Clausura
 Copa Libertadores (1): 2000
 Copa de Oro (1): 1993

Villarreal
 UEFA Intertoto Cup (2): 2003, 2004

Universidad Católica (1)
 Primera División (1): 2010

Manager
Boca Juniors
 Primera División (1): 2015
 Copa Argentina (1): 2014–15

Al-Rayyan
Sheikh Jassim Cup (1): 2018

Shabab Al Ahli
 UAE President's Cup (1): 2018–19
 UAE League Cup (1): 2018–19
 UAE Pro League: Runner-up 2018–19

References

External links

 Football database
 Argentine soccer
 Yahoo! Sports
 Champions League
 Argentine Primera statistics at Fútbol XXI 

1975 births
Living people
Argentine people of Basque descent
Citizens of Spain through descent
People from Marcos Paz Partido
Sportspeople from Buenos Aires Province
Argentine footballers
Association football fullbacks
Boca Juniors footballers
Rosario Central footballers
Villarreal CF players
AEK Athens F.C. players
Club Atlético Tigre footballers
Club Deportivo Universidad Católica footballers
Argentine Primera División players
La Liga players
Super League Greece players
Chilean Primera División players
Argentina youth international footballers
Argentina international footballers
1995 King Fahd Cup players
Footballers at the 1995 Pan American Games
Pan American Games medalists in football
Pan American Games gold medalists for Argentina
Argentine expatriate footballers
Argentine expatriate sportspeople in Spain
Argentine expatriate sportspeople in Greece
Argentine expatriate sportspeople in Chile
Expatriate footballers in Spain
Expatriate footballers in Greece
Expatriate footballers in Chile
Argentine emigrants to Spain
Argentine football managers
Club Atlético Tigre managers
Club Nacional de Football managers
Boca Juniors managers
Al-Wasl F.C. managers
Al-Rayyan SC managers
Argentine Primera División managers
Uruguayan Primera División managers
UAE Pro League managers
Qatar Stars League managers
Argentine expatriate football managers
Argentine expatriate sportspeople in Uruguay
Argentine expatriate sportspeople in the United Arab Emirates
Argentine expatriate sportspeople in Qatar
Expatriate football managers in Uruguay
Expatriate football managers in the United Arab Emirates
Expatriate football managers in Qatar
Medalists at the 1995 Pan American Games
Pyramids FC managers